The Record is a daily newspaper based in Stockton, California, serving San Joaquin and Calaveras Counties. It is owned by Gannett.

History 
The Record was founded in 1895 by Irving Martin as the Evening Record. It is a newspaper that covers stories in the Stockton, San Joaquin and the Mother Lode areas; as well as surrounding areas and a national level as well.
In 1969, Speidel Newspapers, Inc. bought The Record and the newspaper introduced its Sunday edition. In March 1977, Gannett Company bought Speidel Newspapers, including The Record. In 1994, Omaha World-Herald Company bought The Record.
On May 5, 2003, Ottaway Community Newspapers bought The Record for $144 Million. Ottaway was the Local Media Group for Dow Jones and Co.  Subsequently, the corporate group changed its name to Dow Jones Local Media Group.

In 2006, The Record began expanding its presence on the Internet as part of a strong digital media initiative.

In 2007, The Record changed its brand to San Joaquin Media Group in reflection to the diversification of the information products and services offered in the market.

On September 4, 2013, News Corp announced that it would sell the Dow Jones Local Media Group to Newcastle Investment Corp.—an affiliate of Fortress Investment Group, for $87 million. The newspapers will be operated by GateHouse Media, a newspaper group owned by Fortress. News Corp. CEO and former Wall Street Journal editor Robert James Thomson indicated that the newspapers were "not strategically consistent with the emerging portfolio" of the company.  GateHouse in turn filed prepackaged Chapter 11 bankruptcy on September 27, 2013, to restructure its debt obligations in order to accommodate the acquisition.

References

External links
SJCrime.com
209Vibe
eSanJoaquin.com
A History of the Record - San Joaquin County Historical Society

Daily newspapers published in California
Mass media in Stockton, California
Gannett publications